Anavryto (before 1927: Γαρδίκι - Gardiki) is a mountain village and a community in the municipal unit Falaisia, Arcadia, Greece. The community consists of the villages Anavryto and Kato Anavryto, 1 km south of Anavryto. Both villages are on the southwestern slope of mount Tsemperou. Anavryto is 3 km southeast of Anemodouri, 3 km northeast of Voutsaras and 11 km southeast of Megalopoli. The village has a school and a church named Agia Marina. Anavryto suffered damage from the 2007 Greek forest fires.

Population

See also

List of settlements in Arcadia

References

External links
University of Patras on Anavryto (in Greek)

Falaisia
Populated places in Arcadia, Peloponnese